Conchita Grangé Beleta ( 6 August 1925 Espuy - 27  August 2019 Toulouse)  was a French-Spanish activist. She was a member of the Resistance during World War II, and survived the Nazi concentration camps .  In France she is known as Conchita Ramos.

Life 
Her father was of Spanish origin born in France, and her mother was Spanish. Shortly after her birth, she was transferred to Toulouse, where she was educated with her maternal family.

At the age of 17, she joined the French Resistance against the Nazis, taking over from her uncle, an active member . In April 1943, she joined the 3rd brigade in the Ariège department , where she worked as a liaison. On 24 May 1944, the French Militia occupied her house, where a guerrilla and three refugees were hiding, and she was arrested and handed over to the Gestapo along with her aunt, Elvira Ibarz, and her cousin, María Ferrer. Conchita. She did not confess, despite torture, in the seven interrogations. She, along with her relatives, was deported, which took two months to reach Nazi Germany with hundreds of members of the resistance, many of them Spanish. She arrived at the Ravensbrück concentration camp on 9 September 1944.

From her experience in the concentration camp, she pointed out the terrible conditions and treatment in which pregnant women were found, who lost their children at birth and never heard from them again; children killed, even torn apart by dogs; "the women subjected to medical and surgical experiments, called petites lapines" ('little bunnies') "by the jailers."

Towards the end of the war and captivity, she was posted to one of the Nazi-formed work groups in Berlin, where she, along with 650 other women, was engaged in the war industry. Of all of them, 115 survived. She returned to Toulouse; she married Josep Ramos, a former Catalan guerrilla fighter.

After the liberation of the concentration camps, she was recognized by the government of France as a sergeant, decorated with the Legion of Honor and the Medal of Resistance . On 26 July 2019, the Torre de Capdella City Council and the Generalitat of Catalonia paid tribute to her.

References

External links 
 Conchita Grangé Ramos, deportada en Ravensbrück